Avdotyinka is a rural locality (a village) in Zheludevskoye Rural Settlement of Shilovsky District, Ryazan Oblast, Russia. The population was 549 as of 2010. There are 2 streets.

Geography 
The village is located on Oka–Don Lowland, 14 km south of Shilovo (the district's administrative centre) by road. Zheludevo is the nearest rural locality.

References 

Rural localities in Ryazan Oblast